John Vance Langmore  (born 3 September 1939) is an Australian academic and politician. He was a member of the Australian House of Representatives from 1984 to 1996.

He studied for a Bachelor of Commerce degree at the University of Melbourne, a Master of Economics degree from Monash University, and a Diploma of Developmental Economics from the University of Cambridge. He then worked as a lecturer in economics at the University of Papua New Guinea from 1969 to 1973. He worked for Ralph Willis in 1983 and 1984 when Willis was the Minister for Employment and Industrial Relations under Prime Minister Bob Hawke.

Langmore was an Australian Labor Party (ALP) politician, and member for the Division of Fraser (ACT). He resigned from Parliament on 6 December 1996, and was replaced in a by-election by Steve Dargavel, another ALP politician. He then worked for the United Nations (UN), as the director of the Division for Social Policy and Development in the UN's Department of Economic and Social Affairs from 1997 to 2002, and then as UN representative of the International Labour Organization; at the time of his appointment in 1997, he was the most senior Australian official in the United Nations Secretariat.

He is now a professorial fellow in the Department of Political Science at the University of Melbourne, and a visiting fellow at the University of New England. He is also the president of the United Nations Association of Australia and an Australian board member of the International Campaign to Abolish Nuclear Weapons.

He has published several books on public and international policy. On 22 September 2005, he launched Dealing with America: The UN, the US and Australia, which examined the relationships the George W. Bush administration in the United States had with the Australian Howard government, and with the United Nations.

Books

Dealing with America: the UN, the US and Australia, (UNSW Press, Sydney, 2005)

To Firmer Ground: Restoring Hope in Australia, (UNSW Press, Sydney, 2007)

References

1939 births
Living people
Academic staff of the University of Melbourne
Australian political writers
Alumni of the University of Cambridge
Australian Labor Party members of the Parliament of Australia
Members of the Australian House of Representatives for Fraser (ACT)
Monash University alumni
University of Melbourne alumni
Economics educators
Australian officials of the United Nations
International Labour Organization people
20th-century Australian politicians
Academic staff of the University of Papua New Guinea
Members of the Order of Australia